Lars Peter Karlsson (17 February 1966 – 11 March 1995) was a Swedish professional ice hockey player.

Playing career
Karlsson was born in Västerås Lundby, Västmanland. He began his ice hockey career with VIK Västerås HK in the First Division. After five seasons, he then had spells with Surahammars IF and  before returning to Västerås for his one and only Elitserien season.

Death
Karlsson was murdered by a 19-year-old man who stabbed him using a knife. The killer claimed that Karlsson made a sexual approach towards him. The killer was a 19-year-old White power skinhead who possessed anti-LGBT propaganda in his home. After the murder, Karlsson's team played a protest match in support of him.  The killer's sentence, which was eight years, outraged some in the Swedish gay community who thought that the murder occurred because of Karlsson's sexuality. Karlsson was not openly gay and his friends are unsure if he was closeted, or was defamed by his killer.

Career statistics

See also
Gay panic defense
List of ice hockey players who died during their playing career

References

External links 

1966 births
1995 deaths
Deaths by stabbing in Sweden
Male murder victims
Örebro IK players
People from Västmanland
People murdered in Sweden
Swedish ice hockey defencemen
Swedish murder victims
Victims of anti-LGBT hate crimes
VIK Västerås HK players
Violence against men in Europe